was a Japanese swimmer.

Irie was born in Takatsuki, Osaka, and graduated from the Engineering Department of Waseda University. He finished fourth in the 100 m backstroke at the 1928 Summer Olympics. Later that year, on October 14, 1928, he set a new world record in the 200 m at 2 minutes 37.8 seconds. At the 1932 Summer Olympics, Irie won the silver medal in the 100 m backstroke, with teammates Masaji Kiyokawa and Kentaro Kawatsu taking the gold and bronze.

References

Further reading

Lohn, John. Historical Dictionary of Competitive Swimming. Scarecrow Press, (2010). 
Toshio Irie's profile at databaseOlympics.com

1911 births
1974 deaths
Waseda University alumni
Olympic swimmers of Japan
Swimmers at the 1928 Summer Olympics
Swimmers at the 1932 Summer Olympics
Olympic silver medalists for Japan
People from Takatsuki, Osaka
Medalists at the 1932 Summer Olympics
Japanese male backstroke swimmers
Olympic silver medalists in swimming
20th-century Japanese people